Fillmore County is a county located in the U.S. state of Nebraska. As of the 2010 United States Census, the population was 5,890. Its county seat is Geneva. The county was named for President Millard Fillmore.

In the Nebraska license plate system, Fillmore County is represented by the prefix 34 (it had the thirty-fourth largest number of vehicles registered in the county when the license plate system was established in 1922).

History
Fillmore County was established, and its boundaries defined, by the Nebraska Territorial Legislature in 1856. It was named for Millard Fillmore, the thirteenth president of the United States, who had left office in 1853.

The first homesteaders arrived in the county in 1866. Ohio natives William O. Bussard and William C. Whitaker filed claims on the West Fork of the Big Blue River in the county's northeastern portion. Settlement of the area was slow until 1870; it was concentrated in the county's northern part, in part because the surveyed route of the Burlington and Missouri River Railroad ran through York County just north of the present-day York-Fillmore county line.

In 1871, the Burlington and Missouri laid its tracks through the area. This placed the route on more level country, reducing the cost of cutting and bridging; it also shifted the line from York County to northern Fillmore County.

The county was formally organized in 1871; up to this time, it had been administered from, and taxed by, Saline County, its neighbor to the east. In April, an election was held to choose officers to organize the county; at this time, it was decided to place the county seat in the county's center. The town site was surveyed and platted, and given the name "Henry". It could not be occupied, since it was on school land owned by the State; an act of the Legislature was necessary before the land could be sold.

The Legislature passed a bill in the summer of 1872 to allow sale of the school lands. At about that time, the new county seat's name was changed from "Henry" to "Geneva", at the suggestion of the daughter of a local settler, who wanted it named after her family's old home of Geneva, Illinois.

The county grew rapidly through the first years of the 1870s. Three towns were established along the Burlington line; in keeping with the railroad's practice of naming their towns alphabetically, they were dubbed Exeter, Fairmont, and Grafton. By 1873, the entire county had been "thickly settled". Its growth suffered a check in the mid-1870s, due to the worldwide depression following the Panic of 1873 and an infestation of grasshoppers in the late summer of 1874.

As additional railroad lines were constructed through the county, new towns were established. In about 1886, the Burlington built a branch line from Beatrice to Holdrege, running east–west through southern Fillmore County; Shickley, Strang, and Ohiowa were founded on or near the route. A north–south line connected this branch to the Burlington's main line, running from Strang to Fairmont.  Milligan was established in 1887, on the Kansas City and Omaha line.

Several ethnic European enclaves developed during the time of the county's homesteading. An extensive Czech settlement covered much of Saline County and extended into eastern Fillmore County, including Milligan.  A concentration of Swedish immigrants developed in eastern Clay County, extending into southwestern Fillmore County in the area between Shickley and Ong.  German settlements formed in both the county's southeastern and southwestern corners.

Geography

The county lies within the watershed of the Big Blue River. Water in the county drains via the West Fork of the Big Blue; via Turkey Creek, which runs into the Big Blue near De Witt, Nebraska; and via the Little Blue, which joins the Big Blue in Kansas.

Fillmore County lies within the eastern portion of Nebraska's loess plain, a region of soil deposited by the wind between 25,000 and 13,000 years ago, forming a plain that slopes to the southeast. The Big Blue and its tributaries have incised channels into the loess surface in places, but in much of the county the original plain remains.

The county's surface is underlain by Cretaceous sedimentary bedrock, topped with unconsolidated Quaternary sediments. The bedrock was eroded into hills and valleys before the deposition of the overlying sediments, so the thickness of the latter varies.

Adjacent counties

 York County  – north
 Seward County – northeast
 Saline County – east
 Jefferson County – southeast
 Thayer County – south
 Nuckolls County – southwest
 Clay County – west
 Hamilton County – northwest

Protected areas

 Bluebill State Wildlife Management Area
 Marsh Hawk State Wildlife Management Area
 Morphy Lagoon National Wildlife Management Area
 Rauscher Lagoon National Wildlife Management Area
 Redhead Wildlife Management Area
 Rolland Lagoon National Wildlife Management Area
 Sandpiper State Wildlife Management Area
 Sora Wildlife Management Area

Demographics

As of the 2000 United States Census, there were 6,634 people, 2,689 households, and 1,801 families in the county. The population density was 12 people per square mile (4/km2). There were 2,990 housing units at an average density of 5 per square mile (2/km2). The racial makeup of the county was 97.75% White, 0.21% Black or African American, 0.44% Native American, 0.06% Asian, 0.02% Pacific Islander, 0.83% from other races, and 0.69% from two or more races. 1.66% of the population were Hispanic or Latino of any race. 48.6% were of German, 10.4% Czech, 7.1% Irish and 7.0% English ancestry.

There were 2,689 households, out of which 30.20% had children under the age of 18 living with them, 59.10% were married couples living together, 5.00% had a female householder with no husband present, and 33.00% were non-families. 30.20% of all households were made up of individuals, and 16.30% had someone living alone who was 65 years of age or older. The average household size was 2.37 and the average family size was 2.95.

The county population contained 26.30% under the age of 18, 5.10% from 18 to 24, 24.00% from 25 to 44, 23.30% from 45 to 64, and 21.30% who were 65 years of age or older. The median age was 41 years. For every 100 females there were 93.50 males. For every 100 females age 18 and over, there were 91.30 males.

The median income for a household in the county was $35,162, and the median income for a family was $41,725. Males had a median income of $29,813 versus $18,507 for females. The per capita income for the county was $17,465. About 4.80% of families and 7.80% of the population were below the poverty line, including 8.20% of those under age 18 and 10.00% of those age 65 or over.

Transportation
  U.S. Route 81 – enters from Thayer County; runs northward into York County.
  U.S. Route 6 runs east–west across the northern part of the county.
  Nebraska Highway 41 runs east–west across the central portion of the county.
  Nebraska Highway 74 runs east–west through the southern part of the county.
 BNSF Railway – runs east–west across northern Fillmore County, passing Exeter, Fairmont, and Grafton.

In the Nebraska license plate system, Fillmore County is represented by the prefix 34: when the state began using county numbers on its license plates in 1922, it had the 34th-largest number of registered vehicles.

Communities

City
 Geneva (county seat)

Villages

 Exeter
 Fairmont
 Grafton
 Milligan
 Ohiowa
 Shickley
 Strang

Unincorporated communities
 Burress
 Carlisle
 Martland

Ghost towns
Dudley 
 Sawyer
 Buxton 
 Turkey Creek 
Martland 
Lyman 
Fillmore 
Bryant 
Eden

Townships

 Belle Prairie
 Bennett
 Bryant
 Chelsea
 Exeter-Fairmont
 Franklin
 Geneva
 Glengary
 Grafton
 Hamilton
 Liberty
 Madison
 Momence
 Stanton
 West Blue

Politics
Fillmore County voters have been reliably Republican since the beginning, selecting the Republican Party candidate in 80% of national elections (as of 2020).

See also
 National Register of Historic Places listings in Fillmore County, Nebraska

Notes

References
 Gaffney, Wilbur G., ed. (1968).  The Fillmore County Story.  Copyrighted by Geneva Community Grange No. 403.
 Keech, C. F. and V. H. Dreeszen (1968).  "Geology and Ground-Water Resources of Fillmore County, Nebraska".  United States Geological Survey.  Retrieved 28 April 2013.
 Perkey, Elton A. (2003).  Perkey's Nebraska Place Names.  Nebraska State Historical Society; revised edition.

External links
 Fillmore County Official Web Site

 
Nebraska counties
1871 establishments in Nebraska